Shmuel Yosef Agnon (July 17, 1888 – February 17, 1970) was one of the central figures of modern Hebrew literature.  In Hebrew, he is known by the acronym Shai Agnon. In English, his works are published under the name S. Y. Agnon.

Agnon was born in Polish Galicia, then part of the Austro-Hungarian Empire, and later immigrated to Mandatory Palestine, and died in Jerusalem.

His works deal with the conflict between the traditional Jewish life and language and the modern world. They also attempt to recapture the fading traditions of the European shtetl (village). In a wider context, he also contributed to broadening the characteristic conception of the narrator's role in literature. Agnon had a distinctive linguistic style, mixing modern and rabbinic Hebrew. 

In 1966, he shared the Nobel Prize in Literature with the poet Nelly Sachs.

Biography

Shmuel Yosef Halevi Czaczkes (later Agnon) was born in Buczacz (Polish spelling, pronounced Buchach) or Butschatsch (German spelling), Polish Galicia (then within the Austro-Hungarian Empire), now Buchach, Ukraine. Officially, his date of birth in the Hebrew calendar was 18 Av 5648 (July 26), but he always said his birthday was on the Jewish fast day of Tisha B'Av, the ninth day of the Jewish month of Av.

His father, Shalom Mordechai Halevy, was ordained as a rabbi, but worked in the fur trade, and had many connections among the Hasidim, His mother's side had ties to the Mitnagdim.

He did not attend school and was schooled by his parents. In addition to studying Jewish texts, Agnon studied writings of the Haskalah, and was also tutored in German. At the age of eight, he began to write in Hebrew and Yiddish, At the age of 15, he published his first poem – a Yiddish poem about the Kabbalist Joseph della Reina. He continued to write poems and stories in Hebrew and Yiddish, which were published in Galicia.

In 1908, he moved to Jaffa in Ottoman Palestine. The first story he published there was "Agunot" ("Forsaken Wives"), which appeared that same year in the journal Ha`omer. He used the pen name "Agnon," derived from the title of the story, which he adopted as his official surname in 1924. In 1910, "Forsaken Wives" was translated into German. In 1912, at the urging of Yosef Haim Brenner, he published a novella, "Vehaya Ha'akov Lemishor" ("The Crooked Shall Be Made Straight").

In 1913, Agnon moved to Germany, where he met Esther Marx (1889-1973), the daughter of Alexander Marx. They married in 1920 and had two children. In Germany he lived in Berlin and Bad Homburg vor der Höhe (1921–24). Salman Schocken, a businessman and later also publisher, became his literary patron and freed him from financial worries. From 1931 on, his work was published by Schocken Books, and his short stories appeared regularly in the newspaper Haaretz, also owned by the Schocken family. In Germany, he continued to write short stories and collaborated with Martin Buber on an anthology of Hasidic stories. Many of his early books appeared in Buber's Jüdischer Verlag (Berlin). The mostly assimilated, secular German Jews, Buber and Franz Rosenzweig among them, considered Agnon to be a legitimate relic, being a religious man, familiar with Jewish scripture. Gershom Scholem called him "the Jews' Jew".

In 1924, a fire broke out in his home, destroying his manuscripts and rare book collection. This traumatic event crops up occasionally in his stories. Later that year, Agnon returned to Palestine and settled with his family in the Jerusalem neighborhood of Talpiot. In 1929, his library was destroyed again during anti-Jewish riots.

When his novel Hachnasat Kalla ("The Bridal Canopy") appeared in 1931 to great critical acclaim, Agnon's place in Hebrew literature was assured. In 1935, he published Sippur Pashut ("A Simple Story"), a novella set in Buchach at the end of the 19th century. Another novel, Tmol Shilshom ("Only Yesterday"), set in Eretz Yisrael (Israel) of the early 20th century, appeared in 1945.

Agnon was a strict vegetarian in his personal life.

Literary themes and influences

Agnon's writing has been the subject of extensive academic research. Many leading scholars of Hebrew literature have published books and papers on his work, among them Baruch Kurzweil, Dov Sadan, Nitza Ben-Dov, Dan Miron, Dan Laor and Alan Mintz. Agnon writes about Jewish life, but with his own unique perspective and special touch. In his Nobel acceptance speech, Agnon claimed "Some see in my books the influences of authors whose names, in my ignorance, I have not even heard, while others see the influences of poets whose names I have heard but whose writings I have not read." He went on to detail that his primary influences were the stories of the Bible. Agnon acknowledged that he was also influenced by German literature and culture, and European literature in general, which he read in German translation. A collection of essays on this subject, edited in part by Hillel Weiss, with contributions from Israeli and German scholars, was published in 2010: Agnon and Germany: The Presence of the German World in the Writings of S.Y. Agnon. The budding Hebrew literature also influenced his works, notably that of his friend, Yosef Haim Brenner. In Germany, Agnon also spent time with the Hebraists Hayim Nahman Bialik and Ahad Ha'am.

The communities he passed through in his life are reflected in his works:
 Galicia: in the books The Bridal Canopy, A City and the Fullness Thereof, A Simple Story and A Guest for the Night.
 Germany: in the stories "Fernheim", "Thus Far" and "Between Two Cities".
 Jaffa: in the stories "Oath of Allegiance", "Tmol Shilshom" and "The Dune".
 Jerusalem: "Tehilla", "Tmol Shilshom", "Ido ve-Inam" and "Shira".

Nitza Ben-Dov writes about Agnon's use of allusiveness, free-association and imaginative dream-sequences, and discusses how seemingly inconsequential events and thoughts determine the lives of his characters.

Some of Agnon's works, such as The Bridal Canopy, And the Crooked Shall Be Made Straight, and The Doctor's Divorce, have been adapted for theatre. A play based on Agnon's letters to his wife, "Esterlein Yakirati", was performed at the Khan Theater in Jerusalem.

Language
Agnon's writing often used words and phrases that differed from what would become established modern Hebrew. His distinct language is based on traditional Jewish sources, such as the Torah and the Prophets, Midrashic literature, the Mishnah, and other Rabbinic literature. Some examples include:

 batei yadayim (lit. "hand-houses") for modern kfafot (gloves).
 yatzta rather than the modern conjugation yatz'a ("she went out").
 rotev meaning soup in place of modern marak. In Modern Hebrew the term 'rotev' means 'sauce'.
 bet kahava for modern bet kafe (coffee house / café), based on transliteration of the word 'coffee' from Arabic, rather than the contemporary term common in Hebrew, which comes from European languages.

Bar-Ilan University has made a computerized concordance of his works in order to study his language.

Awards and critical acclaim

Agnon was twice awarded the Bialik Prize for literature (1934 and 1950). He was also twice awarded the Israel Prize, for literature (1954 and 1958).

In 1966, he was awarded the Nobel Prize in Literature "for his profoundly characteristic narrative art with motifs from the life of the Jewish people". The prize was shared with German Jewish author Nelly Sachs. In his speech at the award ceremony, Agnon introduced himself in Hebrew: "As a result of the historic catastrophe in which Titus of Rome destroyed Jerusalem and Israel was exiled from its land, I was born in one of the cities of the Exile. But always I regarded myself as one who was born in Jerusalem". The award ceremony took place on a Saturday during the Jewish festival of Hanukkah. Agnon, who was religiously observant, postponed attendance at the awards ceremony until he had performed two Jewish ceremonies of his own on Saturday night, to end the Sabbath and to light the menorah.

In later years, Agnon's fame was such that when he complained to the municipality that traffic noise near his home was disturbing his work, the city closed the street to cars and posted a sign that read: "No entry to all vehicles, writer at work!"

Death and legacy

 

Agnon died in Jerusalem on February 17, 1970. His daughter, Emuna Yaron, has continued to publish his work posthumously. Agnon's archive was transferred by the family to the National Library in Jerusalem. His home in Talpiot, built in 1931 in the Bauhaus style, was turned into a museum, Beit Agnon. The study where he wrote many of his works was preserved intact. Agnon's image, with a list of his works and his Nobel Prize acceptance speech, appeared on the fifty-shekel bill, second series, in circulation from 1985 to 2014. The main street in Jerusalem's Givat Oranim neighborhood is called Sderot Shai Agnon, and a synagogue in Talpiot, a few blocks from his home, is named after him. Agnon is also memorialized in Buchach, now in Ukraine, where he was born. There is an extensive (relative to the size of the museum) exhibition in the Historical Museum in Buchach and, just a few yards away, a bust of Agnon is mounted on a pedestal in a plaza across the street from the house where he lived. The house itself is preserved and marked as the home where Agnon lived from birth till the age of (approximately) 19; the street that runs in front of the house is named "Agnon Street" (in Ukrainian).

Agnotherapy is a method developed in Israel to help elderly people express their feelings.

Beit Agnon
After Agnon's death, the former mayor of Jerusalem Mordechai Ish-Shalom initiated the opening of his home to the public. In the early 1980s, the kitchen and family dining room were turned into a lecture and conference hall, and literary and cultural evenings were held there. In 2005, the Agnon House Association in Jerusalem renovated the building, which reopened in January 2009. The house was designed by the German-Jewish architect Fritz Korenberg, who was also his neighbor.

Published works

Novels and novellas
 The Bridal Canopy (1931), translated from Hakhnāsat kallāh. An epic describing Galician Judaism at the start of the 19th century. The story of a poor but devout Galician Jew, Reb Yudel, who wanders the countryside with his companion, Nuta, during the early 19th century, in search of bridegrooms for his three daughters.
 In the Heart of the Seas, a story of a journey to the land of Israel (1933), translated from Bi-levav yamim. A short novel about a group of ten men who travel from Eastern Europe to Jerusalem.
 A Simple Story (1935), translated from Sipur pashut. A short novel about a young man, his search for a bride, and the lessons of marriage.
 A Guest for the Night (1938), translated from Ore'ah Noteh Lalun. A novel about the decline of eastern European Jewry. The narrator visits his old hometown and discovers that great changes have occurred since World War I.
 Betrothed (1943), translated from Shevuat Emunim. A short novel.
 Only Yesterday (1945), translated from Temol shilshom. An epic novel set in the Second Aliyah period.  It follows the story of the narrator from Galicia to Jaffa to Jerusalem. Sometimes translated as Those Were The Days.
 Edo and Enam (1950). A short novel.
 To This Day (1952), translated from ʿAd henah. A tale of a young writer stranded in Berlin during World War I.
 Shira (1971). A novel set in Jerusalem in the 1930s and 1940s. Manfred Herbst, a middle-aged professor suffering from boredom, spends his days prowling the streets searching for Shira, the beguiling nurse he met when his wife was giving birth to their third child. Against the background of 1930s Jerusalem, Herbst wages war against the encroachment of age.

Short stories
 Of Such and Of Such, a collection of stories, including "And the Crooked Shall Be Made Straight", "Forsaken Wives", and "Belevav Yamim" ("In the Heart of the Seas") from 1933.
 At the Handles of the Lock (1923), a collection of love stories, including "Bidmay Yameha" ("In the Prime of Her Life"), "A Simple Story", and "The Dune".
 Near and Apparent, a collection of stories, including "The Two Sages Who Were In Our City", "Between Two Cities", "The Lady and the Peddler", the collection "The Book of Deeds", the satire "Chapters of the National Manual", and "Introduction to the Kaddish: After the Funerals of Those Murdered in the Land of Israel".
 Thus Far, a collection of stories, including "Thus Far", "Prayer", "Oath of Allegiance", "The Garment", "Fernheim", and "Ido ve-Inam" (Edo and Enam).
 The Fire and the Wood, a collection of stories including Hasidic tales, a semi-fictional account of Agnon's family history and other stories.
 Tale of the Goat

English translations
 " Forever (Ad Olam)", Translated and commentary by Yehuda Salu, CreateSpace, 2014. 
 A Simple Story, revised edition, translated by Hillel Halkin, The Toby Press, 2014.
 Shira, revised edition of SY Agnon's final novel, The Toby Press, 2014
 Two Tales: Betrothed & Edo and Enam, contains two short novellas.
 Twenty-One Stories, a collection of translated stories from "The Book of Deeds" and elsewhere.
 Israeli Stories, ed. Joel Blocker. Contains the stories "Tehilah" (1950) and "Forevermore" (1954).
 New Writing in Israel, ed. Ezra Spicehandler and Curtis Arnson.  Contains the story "Wartime in Leipzig", an excerpt from "In Mr. Lublin's Store".
 A Dwelling Place of My People, contains 16 short stories about the Hassidim of Poland, from the Hebrew Volume "These and Those" (1932).
 Jaffa, belle of the seas: Selections from the works of S.Y. Agnon
Tehilah, Israel Argosy, trans. by Walter Lever, Jerusalem Post Press, Jerusalem, 1956

Anthologies
 Days of Awe (1938), a book of customs, interpretations, and legends for the Jewish days of mercy and forgiveness: Rosh Hashanah, Yom Kippur, and the days between.
 Present at Sinai: The Giving of the Law (1959), an anthology for the festival of Shavuot.

Posthumous publications
 Ir Umeloah ("A City and the Fullness Thereof") (1973), a collection of stories and legends about Buczacz, Agnon's hometown.
 In Mr. Lublin's Store (1974), set in Germany of the First World War.
 Within the Wall (1975), a collection of four stories.
 From Myself to Myself (1976), a collection of essays and speeches.
 Introductions (1977), stories.
 Book, Writer and Story (1978), stories about writers and books from the Jewish sources.
 The Beams of Our House (1979), two stories, the first about a Jewish family in Galicia, the second about the history of Agnon's family.
 Esterlein Yakirati ("Dear Esther: Letters 1924–1931" (1983), letters from Agnon to his wife.
 A Shroud of Stories (1985).
 The Correspondence between S.Y. Agnon and S. Schocken (1991), letters between Agnon and his publisher.
 Agnon's Alef Bet Poems (1998), a children's guide to the Hebrew Alphabet.
 A Book That Was Lost: Thirty Five Stories (2008)

In 1977 the Hebrew University published Yiddish Works, a collection of stories and poems that Agnon wrote in Yiddish during 1903–1906.

See also
List of Israel Prize recipients
List of Bialik Prize recipients
List of Israeli Nobel laureates
List of Jewish Nobel laureates
List of Polish Jews
List of Galician Jews

References

Bibliography

 Arnold J. Band, Nostalgia and nightmare : a study in the fiction of S.Y. Agnon, Berkeley and Los Angeles : University of California Press, 1968.
 Nitza Ben-Dov, Agnon's art of indirection: Uncovering latent content in the fiction of S.Y Agnon, Brill, (Leiden). 1993. .
Gershon Shaked, Shmuel Yosef Agnon: A Revolutionary Traditionalist. New York University Press, 1989.
 Anne Golomb Hoffman, Between Exile and Return: S.Y. Agnon and the Drama of Writing, New York: SUNY, 1991. .
 Amos Oz, The Silence of Heaven: Agnon's Fear of God, Princeton University Press, 2000.
 Roman Katsman, Literature, History, Choice: The Principle of Alternative History in Literature (S.Y. Agnon, The City with All That is Therein). Newcastle: Cambridge Scholars Publishing, 2013.
 
 Yaniv Hagbi, Language, Absence, Play: Judaism and Superstructuralism in the Poetics of S. Y. Agnon, Syracuse: Syracuse University Press, 2009.
 Ilana Pardes, Agnon's Moonstruck Lovers: The Song of Songs in Israeli Culture, Seattle: University of Washington Press, 2013.
 Ahuva Feldman, "Consciousness of time and mission in S. Y. Agnon's Shira. Hebrew Studies 50 (2009) 339-381.
 Marc Bernstein, Midrash and marginality: The Agunot of S. Y. Agnon and Devorah Baron. Hebrew Studies 42:7-58.

External links

 Biography of Shmuel Yosef Agnon (Jewish Agency for Israel)
 Archive of Midrash Agnon course on 5 short stories from Agnon House and WebYeshiva.org.
 Archive of course on Agnon's novella "Tehilla" broadcast from Agnon House and WebYeshiva.org.
 Shiri Lev Ari: S.Y. Agnon's relatives: The East Jerusalem Nashashibis (Ha'aretz, July 10, 2006)
 Dan Laor: Agnon's biographer describes his long journey home
 
Biography
 Jewish Renaissance Pioneers: Shmuel Yosef Agnon
 Agnon's Nobel Prize Speech
 
 Ziva Shamir, The portrait of Agnon's stage adapter as a literary interpreter (Lecture)

1888 births
1970 deaths
Nobel laureates in Literature
Israeli Nobel laureates
Austro-Hungarian Nobel laureates
People from Buchach
People from the Kingdom of Galicia and Lodomeria
Jews from Galicia (Eastern Europe)
Austro-Hungarian Jews
Austro-Hungarian emigrants to the Ottoman Empire
Ashkenazi Jews in Mandatory Palestine
Israeli Orthodox Jews
Israeli people of Polish-Jewish descent
Israeli people of Ukrainian-Jewish descent
Israel Prize in literature recipients
Jewish Israeli writers
Hebrew-language poets
Israeli novelists
Israeli male short story writers
Israeli short story writers
Burials at the Jewish cemetery on the Mount of Olives
20th-century poets
20th-century novelists
20th-century short story writers
Orthodox Jews in Mandatory Palestine